Tabley Inferior is a civil parish in Cheshire East, England. It contains 14 buildings that are recorded in the National Heritage List for England as designated listed buildings.  Of these, two are listed at Grade I, the highest grade, one is listed at Grade II*, the middle grade, and the others are at Grade II.  Much of the parish is occupied by the estate of Tabley House, and 13 of the listed buildings are associated with it, the other listed building being a timber-framed house.

Key

Buildings

See also

Listed buildings in Plumley
Listed buildings in Toft
Listed buildings in Pickmere
Listed buildings in Tabley Superior

References
Citations

Sources

Listed buildings in the Borough of Cheshire East
Lists of listed buildings in Cheshire